Akis is a Greek masculine given name. It may refer to the following:

Akis Agiomamitis, Greek Cypriot footballer and football manager
Akis Cleanthous (1964–2011), Greek Cypriot politician and financial analyst
Akis Katsoupakis (born 1972), Greek pop musician
Akis Petretzikis (born 1984), Greek celebrity chef
Akis Tsochatzopoulos (1939–2021), Greek politician, engineer, and economist
Akis Zikos (born 1974), Greek footballer

See also
Akis (disambiguation)

Greek masculine given names
Given names of Greek language origin